Thisted Airport  is a small airport servicing the Danish town of Thisted. It is owned by Thisted municipality. It is located on Danish national road 26, 8 kilometers from Hanstholm and 15 kilometers from Thisted. The airport opened in 1970.

Overview
Thisted Airport previously serviced two daily flights between Thisted and the Danish capital, Copenhagen, a service operated by flying.dk which also served as operator of the airport. Flying.dk suspended all flights from the airport effective 1 February 2007. Thisted municipality has supported operations of the airport with an annual 2.5 million DKK. No new operator has been found, and public funding would be needed to operate flights. The nearest airport from Thisted is Aalborg Airport,  road distance.

Statistics

See also
 List of the largest airports in the Nordic countries

References
This article is based on the corresponding article on the Danish Wikipedia, accessed on 15 April 2007.

External links

AIP Denmark: Thisted - EKTS
VFR Flight Guide Denmark: Thisted - EKTS

Airports in Denmark
Thisted Municipality
Transport in the North Jutland Region
Buildings and structures in Thisted Municipality